Still Life was an American post-hardcore band originally from Moorpark, California, and then the San Fernando Valley, California. They are credited for helping pioneer the first wave of emo. They started in the late 1980s with the name Monster Club. They changed their name in 1991 after the departure of the original lead singer Rick Rodney who joined the band Strife. They were active until 2003 when all of their instruments were stolen from Chris Pitzel's truck parked on the street in front of their house after a show. Former Members Paul Rauch and David Pitzel have started a new band named Old Ground and continue to use Still Life's label, Sunflower Tribe.

Discography 

 Still Life/Evergreen split (Anomaly) 7"
 Still Life (self-titled) (Rhetoric Records) 7"
 Slow Children at Play (Rhetoric) 8"
 Still Life/Cerberus Shoal (Tree Records) 7"
 From Angry Heads with Skyward Eyes (Ebullition Records) 2xLP/CD
 Still Life/Jara split (Sunflower Tribe) 12"
 Still Life/Resin split (Sunflower Tribe) 12"
 The Madness and the Gackle (Sunflower Tribe) 12"/CD
 Slow Children at Play and Beyond (Sunflower Tribe) 12"/CD
 Limitations, Boundaries, and Failures EP (Greyday Records) 12"/CD
 The Incredible Sinking Feeling (Greyday Records) CD

External links 
 http://www.ebullition.com/catalog16.html
 http://www.sunflowertribe.com
 https://web.archive.org/web/20060813081816/http://www.greydayproductions.com/bands/still.html
 http://www.twoifbysearecords.com/advanced_search_result.php?keywords=still+life

Emo musical groups from California
American post-hardcore musical groups
Musical groups established in 1989
Musical groups disestablished in 2003